Katol Assembly constituency is one of the 288 Vidhan Sabha (legislative assembly) constituencies of Maharashtra state in western India.

Overview
Katol (constituency number 48) is one of the 12 Vidhan Sabha constituencies located in the Nagpur district. It covers the entire Narkhed and Katol talukas and part of Nagpur (Rural) taluka. Number of electorates was 245,811 in 2009 (male 128,076, female 117,735).

Katol is part of the Ramtek Lok Sabha constituency along with five other Vidhan Sabha segments of this district, namely Savner, Hingna, Umred, Kamthi and Ramtek.
In the 2014 Maharashtra Assembly Election the candidates listed below were standing in this assembly seat:-

 Ashish Ranjit Deshmukh-  -  Bhartiya Janta Party 
 Rahul Virendrababu Deshmukh-  -  Shetakari Kamagar paksh
 Rajendra Harne-  -  Shivsena
 Dinesh Thakre-  -  Indian National Congress
 Anil Vasantrao Deshmukh-  -  Nationalist Congress Party
 Gaikwad-  -  Maharashtra Navnirman Sena

Members of Legislative Assembly

Election results

Assembly Election 2014

Assembly Election 2019

See also
 Katol
 List of constituencies of Maharashtra Vidhan Sabha

References

Assembly constituencies of Nagpur district
Assembly constituencies of Maharashtra